Major-General Randal Rumley (12 November 1804 – 13 September 1884) was a British Army officer who became Commander-in-Chief, Scotland.

Military career
Rumley was commissioned into the British Army on 20 December 1824 and served for much of his military career in the 60th Rifles. He became Inspector General of Infantry in April 1861. He was despatched to Canada in 1862 to take command of the 2nd Division as the British Government took steps to strengthen its military forces as a result of tensions created by the Trent Affair. Promoted to major-general on 9 November 1862, he went on to command the troops in the North British District, a role that he had taken up by 1868 and retired from in 1873.

Rumley was also colonel of the 27th (Inniskilling) Regiment of Foot from 1870 until its amalgamation into the Royal Inniskilling Fusiliers in 1881, after which he was Colonel of the 1st Battalion of the new regiment until 1884. He was then made Colonel of the 1st Battalion, 60th Regiment of Foot from April 1884 until his death in September 1884.

Personal life
On 30 September 1838, Rumley married Caroline Mary Berkeley, daughter of Sir George Henry Frederick Berkeley, grandson of Augustus Berkeley, 4th Earl of Berkeley.

Rumley was killed in a carriage accident while visiting a Mr. Butler of Chilton Lodge in Leverton, Berkshire.

References

 

|-

|-

|-

1804 births
1884 deaths
Military personnel from Somerset
People from Bath, Somerset
British Army major generals
King's Royal Rifle Corps officers
Royal Inniskilling Fusiliers officers
27th Regiment of Foot officers
Road incident deaths in England